The 2006 Omloop Het Volk was the 59th edition of the Omloop Het Volk cycle race and was held on 25 February 2006. The race started in Ghent and finished in Lokeren. The race was won by Philippe Gilbert.

General classification

References

2006
Omloop Het Nieuwsblad
Omloop Het Nieuwsblad
February 2006 sports events in Europe